Dolnje Vreme is a village in the Municipality of Divača in the Littoral region of Slovenia.

References

External links 

Dolnje Vreme on Geopedia

Populated places in the Municipality of Divača